James Edward Rogan (born August 21, 1957) is an American judge of the Superior Court of California, adjunct law professor, author and former Member of the United States House of Representatives from California. He also formerly served as United States Under Secretary of Commerce for Intellectual Property, Director of the United States Patent and Trademark Office, California State Assembly Majority Leader, a judge of the California Municipal Court, a gang murder prosecutor with the Los Angeles County District Attorney's office and a civil litigator in private law practice. In January 2007, President George W. Bush nominated Rogan to be a federal judge for the United States District Court for the Central District of California, but the Senate failed to act on the nomination before the expiration of Bush's term in office.

Early life and education 
Rogan was expelled from high school in the tenth grade. Although he never completed high school formally, Rogan attended Chabot Community College — now Las Positas Community College — in Livermore. He went on to earn a bachelor's degree in political science from the University of California at Berkeley, and later his Juris Doctor degree from UCLA Law School, where he was a member of the UCLA Law Review. Rogan helped pay his way through law school by working as a bartender and bouncer at several Hollywood night clubs.

Early professional career 
Rogan did a short stint (1983–1985) as a civil litigation attorney in one of Los Angeles' oldest law firms (Lillick McHose & Charles). He resigned from his firm and signed on as a Los Angeles County Deputy District Attorney, where he later was recruited to the "Hardcore Gang Murder Unit". He prosecuted some of Los Angeles' most notorious street gangs. In a 1990 statewide poll of prosecutors, defense attorneys and judges, California Lawyer Magazine named Rogan as one of the state's most effective prosecutors.

Later that year Governor George Deukmejian appointed the 33-year-old prosecutor to be a judge of the Glendale Municipal Court. Rogan was California's youngest sitting state court judge at the time of his elevation to the bench. During his service on the municipal court (1990–1994) Rogan presided over thousands of civil and criminal cases. In 1993 his colleagues elected him presiding judge of their local court. He began teaching as an adjunct professor of law in 1987; over the next two decades he taught at various law schools in Southern California, and continues teaching to date. He has been an adjunct professor of criminal law, criminal procedure, trial practice and trial advocacy. He has lectured in many other areas of law, including evidence and intellectual property.

California State Assembly 
In 1994 Rogan ran for and won a special election to the California State Assembly after the previous incumbent, former GOP minority leader Pat Nolan resigned after he was convicted of charges of accepting illegal campaign contributions as a result of an FBI sting operation. Nolan was later pardoned by President Donald Trump. In Rogan's freshman term his colleagues elected him Majority Leader. California Journal Magazine named him the Assembly's most effective legislator, and ranked him No. 1 in integrity and No. 1 in effectiveness. He served on the Assembly's Appropriations, Budget, Public Safety, Natural Resources, and Education Committees.

United States Congress 

In 1996, Rogan won the first of two terms to the United States House of Representatives. Elected with just 50.1%, Rogan became one of only two House members to serve on both the House Commerce Committee and the House Judiciary Committee. On the House Judiciary Committee, Rogan and his colleagues were responsible for reviewing all proposed legislation dealing with a variety of complex issues, including all intellectual property issues (copyrights, patents and trademarks); protection of trade and commerce against unlawful restraint of trade and monopolies; the judiciary and all judicial proceedings (civil and criminal); administrative proceedings; immigration issues; bankruptcy law, and all proposed constitutional amendments. 

As a member of the Judiciary Committee's Subcommittee on Immigration, Rogan was a leader in helping to increase the number of H1-B immigration visas that are critical to America's high-tech community. As a member of the House Commerce Committee, Rogan served on the oldest and most powerful Committee in the House. Further, as a member of the two most critical subcommittees (the Telecommunications, Trade and Consumer Protection subcommittee, and the Energy and Power subcommittee) Rogan shared responsibility for helping to craft legislation on all matters of interstate and foreign commerce and trade; interstate and foreign telecommunications, regulation of commercial practices (including the Federal Trade Commission); consumer affairs and consumer protection; product liability issues; motor vehicle safety; and all laws relating to national energy policy, including utility issues, and regulation of nuclear facilities. 

During his congressional service, Rogan was Assistant Majority Whip for the House Republican Conference, helping mobilize House votes on key legislative objectives, provided legislative information to Members and the House leadership, and helped to coordinate legislative and political strategies within the Congress. He also was a member of both Speaker Gingrich and Majority Leader Dick Armey's "Kitchen Cabinet" advisory groups. He met regularly with the Speaker and the Majority Leader to discuss political and legislative strategies and tactics during the congressional session. Speaker Gingrich named Rogan as co-chairman of the Speaker's High Tech Task Force, and named Rogan Speaker Pro Tempore on numerous occasions.

The impeachment trial of President Bill Clinton 
Because of his background as a prosecutor and his reputation for respect among Republicans and Democrats, Rogan was selected to be one of the thirteen house managers in the impeachment trial of President Clinton. Although Rogan and his predecessor in the 27th District were both Republican, the district had been trending Democratic for some time, and many of the district's constituents opposed the impeachment. In 2000, Democrats made defeating Rogan a high priority in the U.S. House races, and he was defeated by then state senator Adam Schiff in the most expensive House race in history at the time.

Post-Congressional career 
Shortly after Rogan left Congress, President George W. Bush selected him to be the U.S. Under Secretary of Commerce for Intellectual Property and director of the U.S. Patent and Trademark Office. Although controlled by a Democratic majority, the U.S. Senate confirmed Rogan unanimously, and he assumed office in December 2001. In this new role, Rogan ran one of the oldest agencies in the federal government, overseeing 8,000 employees and a $1.5 billion budget. He served as chief advisor to the president on all matters of intellectual property and authored the USPTO's 21st Century Strategic Plan, a reorganization of the 214-year-old agency to modernize and integrate its operations with the leading world intellectual property offices. 

Rogan left the Bush Administration in early 2004, and joined the law firm of Venable LLP, where he worked as a partner in their Southern California and Washington, D.C offices. Later, he joined Preston Gates & Ellis LLP, working out of their California and D.C. offices.

On October 3, 2006, California Governor Arnold Schwarzenegger appointed Rogan to the Superior Court of California, where he serves currently. He won reelection without opposition to the position in 2008, 2014, and 2020.

In January 2007, President George W. Bush nominated Rogan for a federal judgeship for the United States District Court for the Central District of California. His nomination received broad bipartisan support, including the unanimous approval of Democratic U.S. Senator Dianne Feinstein's judicial nominee review committee, along with the highest rating from the American Bar Association. Despite this, the Democratic-controlled United States Senate Judiciary Committee declined to give Rogan's nomination a hearing because U.S. Senator Barbara Boxer put a hold on the nomination, citing Rogan's role in Clinton's impeachment as the reason. His nomination died at the end of the 109th Congress in January 2009 because the Senate failed to act on it.

Superior Court of California 
In July 2006, California governor Arnold Schwarzenegger appointed Rogan to serve as a judge on the Superior Court of California in Orange County; Rogan took office in October 2006, where he still serves. He won election to a full term without opposition in 2008, and again in 2014 and 2020. Since the mid-1980s he has served as an adjunct professor of law at various law schools in Southern California, where he has taught criminal law, criminal procedure, evidence, and trial advocacy.

Personal life 
Rogan planned on marrying his longtime girlfriend, Terri Lemke, but the relationship did not survive his move to Los Angeles to attend law school. He married Christine Apffel in 1988; they have twin daughters.

Bibliography 
Rogan has authored four non-fiction books, and one work of historical fiction:

Rough Edges: My Unlikely Road from Welfare to Washington, Harper Collins, 2004. Rogan's rollicking early memoir tells the story of how he was born the illegitimate son of a cocktail waitress single mother who was later convicted of a felony. He grew up amid a circle of tough friends; after years of borderline delinquency, he was expelled from high school, and he worked at many colorful jobs—from porn theater bouncer to bartender at a Sunset Strip female mud-wrestling bar and at a Hell's Angels bar. Despite these many handicaps, he went on to become a lawyer, a gang murder prosecutor in the Los Angeles County District Attorney's office, a municipal and superior court judge, state legislator, majority leader of the California State Assembly, and a U.S. congressman. memoir; In 2004, Reader's Digest named "Rough Edges" among their top four nonfiction books for 2004-05 and published the condensed version in its distinguished hardback series. 
 Catching Our Flag: Behind the Scenes of a Presidential Impeachment, WND Books, 2011. Rogan's behind the scenes memoir of the President Bill Clinton impeachment saga of the 1990s. Rogan had ascertained that, should the scandal lead to impeachment proceedings, future accounts would suffer from faulty memories or faulty motives. To combat the threat of factual or historical error, Rogan, from his first day on the House Judiciary Committee, kept copious notes during every significant meeting relating to impeachment, to create a complete and accurate historical chronicle of what truly occurred behind the scenes in the unfolding drama.
And Then I Met...Stories of Growing Up, Meeting Famous People, and Annoying the Hell Out of Them, WND Books, 2014. This book treats readers to a vast collection of stories from Rogan's boyhood in San Francisco  when he met storied and famous individuals-—from presidents, presidential candidates, sports and movie stars, and a parade of other notables. These charming and fun stories stretch from his meeting the last surviving witness of the massacre of General Custer to the stars of Gone With the Wind and The Wizard of Oz.
On to Chicago: Rediscovering Robert F. Kennedy and the Lost Campaign of 1968, WND Books, 2018. Released on the 50th anniversary of Senator Robert F. Kennedy's assassination—June 6, 2018—this gripping historical fiction answers for history based on facts, and not on idealized or romantic notions, what likely would have happened if RFK had lived to go on finish his campaign for the 1968 Democratic presidential nomination to Chicago, the city that hosted that year's tumultuous Democratic National Convention. On to Chicago is a heavily researched and sourced work that twists the arc of history with facts that will appeal both to fiction lovers as well as pure history aficionados, because so much of it is true. With nearly one thousand endnotes online that confirm how much of this story mirrors reality, many revelations will surprise even the most dedicated history buffs.
''Shaking Hands with History: My Encounters with the Famous, the Infamous, and the Once-Famous But Now-Forgotten,"" Shenandoah Books, 2020 In his fifth book, Rogan reminiscences about the greats, the near-greats, and the once great but now forgotten people he has known. He again throws open the covers of his private journals and photo albums to share with you more of his stories of private celebrity encounters. Each page pulls names from the headlines and the history books: boxing legend Muhammad Ali, President Ronald Reagan, first man on the Moon Neil Armstrong, Senator Ted Kennedy, astronaut John Glenn, baseball icon Hank Aaron, and many more. You'll experience everything from the firsthand accounts of people Rogan knew that rode with John F. Kennedy in his fatal 1963 Dallas motorcade to recollections from the heroes and villains of America's greatest political scandal-Watergate.

References

External links

|-

|-

|-

|-

1957 births
Living people
20th-century American lawyers
20th-century American judges
20th-century American politicians
21st-century American lawyers
21st-century American judges
21st-century American politicians
American memoirists
California state court judges
George W. Bush administration personnel
Republican Party members of the California State Assembly
Politicians from San Francisco
Republican Party members of the United States House of Representatives from California
Under Secretaries of Commerce for Intellectual Property
University of California, Berkeley alumni
UCLA School of Law alumni
Members of Congress who became lobbyists